Leslie Peirez is an American television producer. She currently works at Verizon Media.

Productions
The Meredith Vieira Show
The Million Second Quiz
The Chew
The Oprah Winfrey Show, 2008–2011
Martha, 2005–2008

References

External links
 

Year of birth missing (living people)
Living people
American television producers
Buckley Country Day School alumni
Hobart and William Smith Colleges alumni